Broșteni is a commune located in Mehedinți County, Oltenia, Romania. It is composed of six villages: Broșteni, Căpățânești, Luncșoara, Lupșa de Jos, Lupșa de Sus and Meriș.

References

Communes in Mehedinți County
Localities in Oltenia